Bazegeh (also Romanized as Bāzegeh and Bazgeh) is a village in Harasam Rural District, Homeyl District, Eslamabad-e Gharb County, Kermanshah Province, Iran. At the 2006 census, its population was 140, in 33 families.

References 

Populated places in Eslamabad-e Gharb County